Elizabeth Eilor was the executive director of the African Women's Economic Policy Network.  The organization trains women in economic literacy and advocacy.  AWEPON is based in Uganda and spans some 20 countries in sub-Saharan Africa.

References

Living people
Ugandan economists
Year of birth missing (living people)
21st-century Ugandan women